The M.Zuiko Digital 45 mm f/1.8 is a prime lens by Olympus Corporation, for the Micro Four Thirds System.  It is sold in a kit with the Olympus PEN camera body and available separately.

External links

 Official Webpage
 Technical Details-Micro Four Thirds Website
 Review - Sansmirror.com website

References

45mm F1.8
Camera lenses introduced in 2011